Northwest Kansas Technical College is a public technical college in Goodland, Kansas, United States.  The college offers 14 different programs ranging from diesel technology to medical assistant. The college also offers certificates and associate degrees.

History
The college began in 1964 as the Northwest Kansas Vocational School.

Athletics
Northwest Kansas Tech is the only technical school in Kansas with an athletic program. It is a member of the Kansas Jayhawk Community College Conference. Men's and women's basketball, men's and women's wrestling, softball, track and field, cross-country and shooting sports are currently offered. The Mavericks usually hold their events at facilities owned by Goodland High School.

References

External links
 

Buildings and structures in Sherman County, Kansas
1964 establishments in Kansas
Educational institutions established in 1964
Technological universities in the United States
Two-year colleges in the United States
NJCAA athletics